Eric Leutheuser (born October 8, 1959) is a Republican member of the Michigan House of Representatives, first elected in 2014.

Prior to his election to the House, Leutheuser was president of an auto dealership and on the boards of the Hillsdale County Community Foundation and the Hillsdale Economic Development Commission. He is a member of the Hillsdale County Rotary Club and Right to Life.

References

1959 births
Living people
Republican Party members of the Michigan House of Representatives
21st-century American politicians
People from Hillsdale, Michigan
Hillsdale College alumni